The Canton of Tremblay-en-France is a French administrative division, located in the arrondissement of Le Raincy, Seine-Saint-Denis, Île-de-France. Its borders were modified at the French canton reorganisation which came into effect in March 2015. Its seat is in Tremblay-en-France.

Composition 
It consists of the following communes:
 Coubron
 Montfermeil
 Tremblay-en-France
 Vaujours

Adjacent cantons 
 Canton of Sevran (west)
 Canton of Livry-Gargan (southwest)
 Canton of Gagny (south)

See also
Cantons of the Seine-Saint-Denis department
Communes of the Seine-Saint-Denis department

References

Tremblay-en-France